Cytospora platani is a plant pathogen that causes cankers on Platanus sp. (American sycamores).

References

External links 
 Index Fungorum
 USDA ARS Fungal Database

Fungal tree pathogens and diseases
Diaporthales